Bernard Reichel (August 3, 1901 – December 10, 1992) was a 20th-century classical composer from the French-speaking part of Switzerland.

Born in Montmirail (canton of Neuchâtel), he settled in Geneva in his twenties. He spent most of his life there, writing a great deal of music, mostly sacred, and working as a music educator. He taught harmony at the Geneva Conservatory for twenty years, and various classes at the Dalcroze institute for 53 years. He was also an organist, serving at the Protestant churches of Chêne-Bougeries and Eaux-Vives, two downtown parishes in Geneva.

His musical language is militantly tonal considering the time in which he wrote and taught, and informed by folk music and medieval modes in a way reminiscent of Ralph Vaughan Williams. His work is little-known outside of Switzerland, overshadowed by that of his contemporaries, Frank Martin and Arthur Honegger.
 
He died in 1992, in Lutry, in the canton of Vaud.

External links
Association Bernard Reichel biography
Association Bernard Reichel : biography, timeline, list of works, etc.
Bernard Reichel at Musinfo
 

1901 births
1992 deaths
20th-century classical composers
Swiss classical composers
Classical composers of church music
Musicians from Geneva
Swiss organists
Male organists
People from the canton of Neuchâtel
Swiss male classical composers
20th-century organists
20th-century male musicians
20th-century Swiss composers